The Middle Zambezi Biosphere Reserve (established 2010) is a UNESCO Biosphere Reserve  located along the Zambezi River in the Zambezi Valley of Zimbabwe. The  reserve consists of riverine and terrestrial ecosystems unique to the subcontinent. Among threatened species found in the valley are the black rhino (Diceros bicornis), the painted wild dog (Lycaon pictus), and the nyala (Tragelaphus angasii). The flora consist of Colophospermum/Combretum/Terminalia woodland and the Zambezi riparian forest. At Mana Pools, it comprises the only flood plain ecosystem left in the Middle Zambezi.

, the total human population is about 40,600, with the major population in the urban area in the Biosphere Reserve and the CAMPFIRE buffer zones. The core zones have only Park staff people, while the safari areas contain less than 50 people at any time, comprising mainly sport hunters and their hosts.

Land Management units comprise the two core areas and 11 buffer zone areas.

Sources

References 

Biosphere reserves of Zimbabwe